The four national languages of Switzerland are German, French, Italian, and Romansh. German, French, and Italian maintain equal status as official languages at the national level within the Federal Administration of the Swiss Confederation, while Romansh is used in dealings with people who speak it.  Latin is occasionally used in some formal contexts, particularly to denote the country (Confederatio Helvetica).

In 2020, 62.3% of the population of Switzerland were native speakers of German (either Swiss German or Standard German) at home; 22.8% French (mostly Swiss French, but including some Franco-Provençal dialects); 8% Italian (mostly Swiss Italian, but including Lombard); and 0.5% Romansh.  The German region (Deutschschweiz) is roughly in the east, north, and centre; the French part (la Romandie) in the west; and the Italian area (Svizzera italiana) in the south. There remains a small Romansh-speaking native population in Grisons in the east. The cantons of Fribourg, Bern, and Valais are officially bilingual; Grisons is officially trilingual.

History
The main languages of Swiss residents from 1950 to 2015, in percentages, were as follows:

In 2012, for the first time, respondents could indicate more than one language, causing the percentages to exceed 100%.

National languages and linguistic regions

German

The German-speaking part of Switzerland constitutes about 65% of Switzerland (North Western Switzerland, Eastern Switzerland, Central Switzerland, most of the Swiss Plateau and the greater part of the Swiss Alps).

In seventeen of the Swiss cantons, German is the only official language (Aargau, Appenzell Ausserrhoden, Appenzell Innerrhoden, Basel-Stadt, Basel-Landschaft, Glarus, Luzern, Nidwalden, Obwalden, Schaffhausen, Schwyz, Solothurn, St. Gallen, Thurgau, Uri, Zug, and Zürich).

In the cantons of Bern, Fribourg and Valais, French is co-official; in the trilingual canton of Graubünden, more than half of the population speaks German, while the rest speak Romansh or Italian. In each case, all languages are official languages of the respective canton.

While the French-speaking Swiss prefer to call themselves Romands and their part of the country is the Romandy, the German-speaking Swiss used to (and, colloquially, still do) refer to the French-speaking Swiss as "Welsche", and to their area as Welschland, which has the same etymology as the English Welsh (see Walha).  Research shows that individuals with a French-sounding name in the German-speaking part suffer from social discrimination.

Nevertheless, in 2017, 11.1%, or about 920,600 of the Swiss residents speak Standard German ("Hochdeutsch") at home, but this statistic is probably mainly due to German (and Austrian) immigrants.

By the Middle Ages, a marked difference had developed within the German-speaking part of Switzerland between the rural cantons (Uri, Schwyz, Unterwalden, Glarus, Zug, Appenzell, Schaffhausen) and the city cantons (Lucerne, Berne, Zurich, Solothurn, Fribourg, Basel, St. Gallen), divided by views about trade and commerce. After the Reformation, all cantons were either Catholic or Protestant, and the denominational influences on culture added to the differences. Even today, when all cantons are somewhat denominationally mixed, the different historical denominations can be seen in the mountain villages, where Roman Catholic Central Switzerland abounds with chapels and statues of saints, and the farmhouses in the very similar landscape of the Protestant Bernese Oberland show Bible verses carved on the housefronts instead.

In addition to this more widespread notion of Swiss German dialect, there is also Walser German, another Highest Alemannic speech brought by Walser emigrants from Valais.

Because the largest part of Switzerland is German-speaking, many French, Italian, and Romansh speakers migrate to the rest of Switzerland, and the children of those non-German-speaking Swiss-born within the rest of Switzerland speak German.

French

Romandy is the French-speaking part of Switzerland. It covers the area of the cantons of Geneva, Vaud, Neuchâtel, and Jura as well as the French-speaking parts of the cantons of Bern (German-speaking majority), Valais (French-speaking majority), and Fribourg (French-speaking majority). 1.9 million people (or 24.4% of the Swiss population) live in Romandy.

Standard Swiss French and the French of France are highly mutually intelligible, though some differences exist. For example, like most Francophone Belgians, speakers of Swiss French use septante (seventy) instead of soixante-dix (literally, "sixty ten") and nonante (ninety) instead of "quatre-vingt-dix" ("four twenty ten"). In the cantons of Vaud, Valais and Fribourg, speakers use huitante (eighty) instead of "quatre-vingts" (four twenties) used in the rest of the French-speaking world; the cantons of Geneva, Bern and Jura use "quatre-vingts". "Sou" is used throughout Romandy for a 5-centime coin, as is "tune" (or "thune") when referring to a 5-Swiss-franc piece. Swiss French also uses "déjeuner, dîner, souper" for breakfast, lunch and dinner instead of "petit-déjeuner, déjeuner, dîner" used in France.

Historically, the vernacular language used by inhabitants of most parts of Romandy was Franco-Provençal. Franco-Provençal (also called Arpitan) is a language sometimes considered to be halfway between the langue d'oïl (the historical language of northern France and ancestor of French) and Occitan (the langue d'oc, spoken in southern France). Standard French and Franco-Provençal/Arpitan, linguistically, are distinct and mutual intelligibility is limited. Increasingly, Franco-Provençal/Arpitan is used only by members of the older generations. In parts of Jura Franc-Comtois dialects are also spoken; these belong to the same Oïl bloc as Standard French.

The term Romandy does not formally exist in the political system, but is used to distinguish and unify the French-speaking population of Switzerland. The television channel Télévision Suisse Romande (TSR) served the Romande community across Switzerland and worldwide through TV5Monde until it was merged with the Radio Suisse Romande (RSR) and renamed RTS (Radio Télévision Suisse) in 2010.

Italian

Italian Switzerland is the Italian-speaking part of Switzerland, which includes the canton of Ticino and the southern part of Grisons. Italian is also spoken in the Gondo Valley (leading to the Simplon Pass, on the southern part of the watershed) in Valais. The traditional vernacular of this region is the Lombard language, specifically its Ticinese dialect.

The linguistic region covers an area of about 3,500 km2 and has a total population of around 350,000, with the number of Italophones residing in Switzerland being 545,274 (about 7% of the Swiss population).

The proportion of Italian-speaking inhabitants had been decreasing since the 1970s, after reaching a high of 12% of the population during the same decade. This was entirely because of the reduced number of immigrants from Italy to Switzerland. However it has increased again during the last decade.

Romansh

Romansh is an official language in the trilingual Canton of Grisons, where the municipalities in turn are free to specify their own official languages.
Romansh has been recognized as one of four "national languages" by the Swiss Federal Constitution since 1938. It was also declared an "official language" of the Confederation in 1996, meaning that Romansh speakers may use their language for correspondence with the federal government and expect to receive a Romansh response. Although Romansh is split into several dialects, the federal and cantonal authorities use the standardized version (Romansh Grischun) exclusively.

Romansh speakers remain predominant in the Surselva, the Albula Region, and the Engiadina Bassa/Val Müstair Region.

Other languages
Besides the national languages and the many varieties of Swiss German, several regional Romance languages are spoken natively in Switzerland: Franco-Provençal and Lombard. 

About 20,000 Romani speak Sinte, an Indic language. 

While learning one of the other national languages at school is important, many Swiss nowadays find it easier to use English as a lingua franca even with other Swiss people of different linguistic backgrounds.

Five sign languages are used: Swiss-German, French, Italian, Austrian, and German.

Neo-Latin

To avoid having to translate the name of Switzerland into the four national languages, Latin is used on the coins of the Swiss franc (Helvetia or Confoederatio Helvetica) and on Swiss stamps (Helvetia). The country code top-level domain for Switzerland on the internet is .ch, the abbreviation of the Latin name, Confoederatio Helvetica (Swiss Confederation); similarly, the International vehicle registration code for Swiss automobiles is "CH". The Federal Palace of Switzerland bears the inscription .

To have a unique name across the country (without favoring German, French or any other language), several Swiss foundations and associations have Latin names, such as Pro Helvetia, Pro Infirmis, Pro Juventute, Pro Natura, Pro Patria, Pro Senectute, Pro Specie Rara, etc.

See also
 Swiss people
 Demographics of Switzerland
 Röstigraben, referring to the asserted difference in mentality between German Swiss and the French-speaking Romands
 Swiss literature
 List of multilingual countries and regions

Notes

References

External links

Swiss German
A quick guide to the Swiss German language
Characteristics of Swiss German dialects
swiss-linguistics.com Information portal on current linguistic research in Switzerland
sieps.ch Information Services on Swiss Private Schools and Universities
Pimsleur Swiss German Pimsleur Swiss German Course

 
Linguistic
Geography of Switzerland
 

af:Romandie
als:Romandie
cs:Romandie
it:Svizzera Italiana
nn:Romandie
pl:Romandia
sv:Romandiet